The AS/SA 202 Bravo is a two to three-seat civil light aircraft jointly designed and manufactured by the Swiss company Flug- und Fahrzeugwerke Altenrhein (FFA) and the Italian company Savoia-Marchetti. The aircraft was designated the AS 202 in Switzerland, and the SA 202 in Italy.

Savoia-Marchetti manufactured the wings, undercarriage and engine installation, while FFA manufactured the fuselage, tail and controls, while  both companies had assembly plants manufacturing the complete aircraft.

The first Swiss model flew on 9 March 1969, the first Italian aircraft following on 8 May.

Bravo is a rugged all-metal low-wing monoplane with a full vision canopy.  Its tricycle landing gear is fixed.

34 15s and 180 18s were built, with most in service with military customers.  The biggest civil operator was Patria Pilot Training at Helsinki-Malmi Airport, Finland during 2000–2011.

Variants
AS/SA 202/10
 With 115 hp Lycoming O-235-C2A engine
AS/SA 202/15
 With 150 hp Lycoming O-320-E2A engine, fixed pitch propeller, optional third aft seat
AS/SA 202/18A
 With 180 hp Lycoming AEIO-360-B1F engine, constant speed propeller, third aft seat, fully aerobatic.
AS/SA 202/26A
With 195 kW (260hp) Lycoming AEIO-540 engine. Only one aircraft was manufactured so far.
AS 32T Turbo Trainer
Two-seat tandem trainer aircraft, powered by a 268 kW (360-hp) Allison 250-B17C turboprop engine. Only one aircraft was manufactured.
FFA 2000 / FFT 2000 / Eurotrainer 2000
Composite derivative

Operators

Civil operators
 
 Patria Pilot Training – 7 aircraft in 2000–2011. Patria's Bravos are ex-British Aerospace Flying College aircraft. BAE Flying College owned 11 aircraft, but 1 was lost in Scotland claiming 2 lives. Remaining 10 aircraft were sold to private Finnish flying school Pilot Factory, which merged with Patria in 2004–2005. 
7 aircraft out of original 10 remain in service. During merger with Patria, one aircraft was sold to private owner. Night-time accident at Helsinki-Malmi airport in 2002 claimed no lives but hull was damaged beyond repair. In August 2010 one aircraft veered off the runway at Helsinki-Malmi and was written off.

Patria's Bravos were replaced with Tecnam P2002JF.

 
 Uganda Central Flying School – 8 aircraft.

Military operators
 
 Ugandan Air Force – 1 aircraft in 2012

Former military operators
 
 Indonesian Air Force – 40 aircraft. Replaced by G 120TP in 2013 – 2014
 
 Iraqi Air Force
 
 Royal Jordanian Air Force
 
 Royal Moroccan Air Force – 10 aircraft.
 Royal Air Maroc – 5 aircraft.
 
 Royal Air Force of Oman 
 Royal Flight of Oman – 4 aircraft.

Specifications (202/15)

See also

References

Bravo
Savoia-Marchetti aircraft
1960s international civil utility aircraft
Single-engined tractor aircraft
Low-wing aircraft
Aircraft first flown in 1969